Choi Jong-won (born January 27, 1950) is a South Korean actor and politician. Choi began his acting career in theater, then made his screen debut in 1978 and became known as a veteran actor of stage, film and television of over forty years. He won Best Supporting Actor at the Grand Bell Awards in 1995 for the Joseon-era period drama The Eternal Empire.

Choi entered politics in 2004, when he ran and lost in the 17th National Assembly elections as an Uri Party candidate. He ran again in the by-elections on July 28, 2010, under the Democratic Party, where he won as the lawmaker representing Gangwon Province (Taebaek, Jeongseon, Yeongwol, and Pyeongchang) in the 18th National Assembly, succeeding Lee Kwang-jae who resigned to run for the Gangwon governorship. On September 16, 2010, Choi was elected as the head of DP's Gangwon provincial chapter.

Filmography

Film

Television series

Theater

Awards and nominations

References

External links 
 
 
 

1950 births
Living people
South Korean male stage actors
South Korean male musical theatre actors
South Korean male film actors
South Korean male television actors
South Korean politicians